The Byrd Leibhart Site, designated 36 YO 170 is a historic archaeological site located in Native Lands County Park at Lower Windsor Township, York County, Pennsylvania.  It was the site of a late 17th-century fortified settlement.  Artifacts were first discovered in 1929, and an excavation undertaken by the Pennsylvania Historical and Museum Commission took place in July–August 1970.  The excavation identified three cemeteries, a village component, stockade, and a longhouse.  The excavations uncovered a range of native and European trade goods dating to the late 17th century.

It was added to the National Register of Historic Places in 2009.

References

External links
Native Lands County Park website

Archaeological sites on the National Register of Historic Places in Pennsylvania
Geography of York County, Pennsylvania
National Register of Historic Places in York County, Pennsylvania